Trottie True is a 1949 British musical comedy film directed by Brian Desmond Hurst and starring Jean Kent, James Donald and Hugh Sinclair. It was known as The Gay Lady in the US, and is an infrequent British Technicolor film of the period. According to BFI Screenonline, "British 1940s Technicolor films offer an abundance of visual pleasures, especially when lovingly restored by the National Film Archive. Trottie True is not among the best known, but comes beautifully packaged, gift wrapped with all the trimmings." The film is based on a novel by Caryl Brahms and S.J. Simon, published in 1946. The New York Times called it "a typical Gay nineties success story" that "amuses but never convulses the reader."

Premise
Trottie True is a Gaiety Girl of the 1890s who, after a brief romance with a balloonist, marries Lord Digby Landon, becoming Duchess of Wellwater when he succeeds to the dukedom. Her music hall background delights the staff, but does not, at first, delight her aristocratic in-laws. But after complimenting Trottie upon doing what she likes, rather than obeying convention, Lady Drinkwater calls her a "true aristocrat".

Digby agrees to lunch with the Marquess of Maidenhead at Romanoff's, and to be the escort of Ruby Rubato (another chorus girl), merely so the married Marquess can philander with another. But Trottie is also dining there, with an old beau, having invited him after they innocently met in Hyde Park, London, after years of separation. Upon seeing each other, Digby and Trottie both believe they have discovered the other in an assignation, as the Marquess has failed to arrive, leaving Digby and Rubato alone.

The film is set as Trottie looks back over her past, whilst staring out of a window at a wedding, and pondering her future.

Cast
 Jean Kent – Trottie True
 James Donald – Lord Digby Landon (later Duke of Wellwater)
 Hugh Sinclair – Maurice Beckenham
 Lana Morris – Bouncie Barrington
 Andrew Crawford – Sid Skinner, the balloonist
 Bill Owen – Joe Jugg
 Michael Medwin – Marquis of Maidenhead
 Joan Young – Mrs True
 Harold Scott – Mr True
 Tony Halfpenny – Perce True
 Daphne Anderson – Bertha True
 Katharine Blake – Ruby Rubato
 Philip Strange – Earl of Burney
 Darcy Conyers – Claude
 Josef Ramart –  Monty's Chauffeur (uncredited) - (Jean Kent's real-life husband, since 1946)
 Francis de Wolff – George Edwardes
 Campbell Cotts – Saintsbury, the butler 
 Harcourt Williams – Duke of Wellwater (Digby's father)
 Mary Hinton – Duchess of Wellwater (Digby's mother)
 Christopher Lee as Hon. Bongo Icklesham
 Roger Moore - stage door Johnny (uncredited)
 Hattie Jacques as Daisy Delaware, a Gaiety girl
 Ian Carmichael - as postman (uncredited)
 Patrick Cargill - as a party guest (uncredited)
 Sam Kydd - as Bedford stage Manager (uncredited)

Production
The exterior shots of the mansion are of Stowe House. Producer Hugh Stewart read the story when he was recovering from jaundice. He bought the film rights and tried to finance the film through MGM, with which he had a contract. MGM did not want to make the film, but Stewart got it financed at Two Cities. MGM loaned Stewart to Two Cities to produce the film.

Stewart says that several directors were considered, including Harold French, before Brian Desmond Hurst was chosen. Anthony Steel made one of his earliest film appearances in Trottie True.

Jean Kent called it her "favourite film. And Harry Waxman was a marvellous cameraman. They weren't good with the music, though. I had a battle about that." She added:
We were scheduled to start and I hadn't heard a word about the music, so I rang up whoever was the head of Two Cities... I finally managed to get half the music done and then I had another argument about the first number. It dissolves from the brown-eyed young Trottie to the hazel-eyed big Trotttie, which was hysterical. They wanted me to sing something in schottische... I said, "It's a very nice number but I come from the music halls and I tell you you cannot use a schottische at this point. So he [the music director] changed it to 6/8 time".
Kent said she had to prevent the filmmakers from cutting away from her singing, "which they used to be very fond of, in British films. The whole point of somebody singing the song is for the audience in the cinema, not the people in the movie. So I had to devise ways to keep moving all the time so they couldn't get the scissors in, particularly during the Marie Lloyd number in the ballroom scene after I'd become the duchess."

Production of the film was interrupted by a crew members' strike in protest over recent sackings of film workers. Three and a half days of filming were lost due to the strike, but it was completed on schedule.

Release
The film was released in the United States by Eagle-Lion as The Gay Lady.

Box office
Trade papers called the film a "notable box office attraction" in British cinemas in 1949.

Critical reception
The New York Times described the film as "the professional and romantic rise of Trottie True as depicted in The Gay Lady, which arrived from England at the Sixtieth Street Trans-Lux on Saturday. But this Technicolored rags to riches ascent, which is interlarded with song and dance turns, is something less than original and rarely sprightly. Trottie True's tale is an old one and it hasn't worn well with the years."

Leonard Maltin rated the film two and a half out of four stars, and called it a "lightweight costume picture...most notable aspect of film is its stunning use of Technicolor. Look fast for Christopher Lee as a dapper stage-door Johnnie."

References

External links

 Trottie True at BFI Screen Online
Trottie True at British Film Institute
 Trottie True at the website dedicated to Brian Desmond Hurst

1949 films
1940s historical films
British historical musical films
1949 musical comedy films
1940s English-language films
Films directed by Brian Desmond Hurst
Films scored by Benjamin Frankel
British black-and-white films
Films set in the 19th century
Films set in London
British musical comedy films
1940s British films